Ward Lake is a lake in the U.S. state of Washington.

Ward Lake was named after Ira Ward, a pioneer citizen.

References

Lakes of Thurston County, Washington